Mengoana is a genus of gastropods belonging to the family Hygromiidae.

The species of this genus are found in Pyrenees.

Species:

Mengoana brigantina
Mengoana jeschaui

References

Hygromiidae